The following is an episode list for the BBC One sitcom Only Fools and Horses. The show is about two brothers who live in Peckham, London. It was first broadcast in the United Kingdom on BBC One on 8 September 1981. It aired for seven seasons and sixteen Christmas specials The final episode was broadcast on 25 December 2003,  In total, 64 regular episodes of Only Fools and Horses were produced, all written by John Sullivan and are now available on both Region 2 and Region 1 DVD.

Additionally, twelve special editions of the show were made, two of these ("Licensed to Drill" and "The Robin Flies at Dawn") have never been broadcast commercially and some have only recently been rediscovered.

All episodes originally aired on BBC One. The list below is ordered by the episodes' original air dates.

Series overview

Episodes

Series 1 (1981)

Series 2 (1982)

Series 3 (1983)

Series 4 (1985)

Series 5 (1986–1987)

Series 6 (1988–1989)

Series 7 (1990–1991)

Christmas Specials (1991–2003)

Ratings

Other media

Short specials

Documentaries

References

Further reading

BBC-related lists
Only Fools and Horses